Kenneth Shane Pickett (born June 6, 1998) is an American football quarterback for the Pittsburgh Steelers of the National Football League (NFL). He played college football at the University of Pittsburgh, where he won the Johnny Unitas Golden Arm Award and was a Heisman Trophy finalist as a senior. He was selected by the Steelers in the first round of the 2022 NFL Draft.

Early years
Pickett was born on June 6, 1998, in the Oakhurst section of Ocean Township, New Jersey. He attended Ocean Township High School. Pickett led the Ocean Township Spartans to the New Jersey Central Group III semifinal game as a junior, leading his team to a 9–2 record. 247Sports ranked Pickett as the No. 23 overall high school football player in New Jersey in his senior year. During his career, he passed for 4,670 yards with 43 touchdowns and rushed for 873 yards and 17 touchdowns. He originally committed to play college football at Temple University, but changed his commitment to the University of Pittsburgh.

College career
Pickett spent most of his true freshman season at Pittsburgh in 2017 as a backup to Max Browne and Ben DiNucci. He started his first career game in Pittsburgh's final game of the season against the second ranked Miami Hurricanes. During the team's upset victory, he completed 18 of 29 passes for 193 yards with a touchdown and also rushed for 60 yards and two touchdowns. Overall for the season he completed 39 of 66 passes for 509 yards, one touchdown and one interception.

Pickett returned as Pittsburgh's starter in 2018. He started all 14 games, completing 180 of 310 passes for 1,969 yards, 12 touchdowns and six interceptions. Pickett led Pittsburgh to their first ever ACC Coastal Division Championship in his first season as the full-time starter. The Associated Press ranked the Panthers as high as the No. 24 team in the country at one point in the 2018 season. The Panthers lost 14–13 to Stanford in the Sun Bowl.

Pickett was again the starter in 2019, making 12 starts and missing one game due to injury. He completed 289 of 469 passes for 3,098 yards, 13 touchdowns and nine interceptions. This was Pickett's first season with Mark Whipple acting as the offensive coordinator, who increased the amount of passes the offense threw each week. He led the Panthers to a 7–5 record heading into the postseason. The Panthers were selected to the 2019 Quick Lane Bowl in Detroit and defeated Eastern Michigan 34–30. Pickett threw for 361 yards and three touchdowns, including a game winning touchdown to wide receiver Taysir Mack in the final minutes of the game.

Pickett and the Panthers played in a shortened season due to the COVID-19 pandemic, going 6–5. Pickett played in nine games and threw for 2,408 yards and 13 touchdowns and nine interceptions in that stretch. The Associated Press ranked the Panthers as high as the No. 21 team in the country at one point in the 2020 season. Despite being eligible for a bowl game, the Panthers collectively opted out of participating in the postseason.

The NCAA granted all 2020 fall athletes an extra year of eligibility, and Pickett used this option to return as the Panthers' starting quarterback in 2021.

Pickett took advantage of his final year of eligibility and broke out as one of the nation’s top players. He recorded 4,319 yards and 42 touchdowns setting school records for single season yards and touchdowns as well as career yards and touchdowns. Pickett was named a first-team All-American and was a finalist for the Heisman Trophy finishing in 3rd place. Pittsburgh won the ACC Championship and finished 11–2 in games Pickett started, the school's best record since 1976. He graduated with a bachelor's degree in marketing and enrolled at Joseph M. Katz Graduate School of Business. In July of the same year Pickett was named the men's ACC Athlete of the Year across all sports, sharing honors with women's recipient Charlotte North of Boston College lacrosse.

Professional career

Various journalists scrutinized Pickett prior to the draft for the size of his hands, measured at 8½ inches, believing it could make him more prone to fumbling the ball. He was selected by the Pittsburgh Steelers in the first round (20th overall) of the 2022 NFL Draft, the latest a quarterback was first taken in a draft since 1997. On September 6, 2022, Pickett was named the backup quarterback for the Steelers behind starter Mitchell Trubisky.

Pickett made his NFL debut in the second half of a Week 4 loss against the New York Jets after starter Mitchell Trubisky was benched. He completed 10 of 13 passes for 120 yards and rushed for two touchdowns, but threw three interceptions in the 24–20 loss. On his first career pass attempt, Pickett threw a deep ball to Chase Claypool that was intercepted by Jordan Whitehead. In his second drive, Pickett scrambled into the end zone for his first ever touchdown in his NFL career. 

On October 4, 2022, Pickett was named the starter by head coach Mike Tomlin. In his first career start against the Buffalo Bills, Pickett completed 34 of 51 passes for 327 yards and an interception in the 38–3 loss. In Week 6 against the Tampa Bay Buccaneers, Pickett threw his first touchdown pass to Najee Harris, but exited the game during the third quarter with a concussion. The Steelers went on to defeat the Buccaneers 20–18, earning Pickett his first career win. 

In Week 14 against the Baltimore Ravens, Pickett once again suffered a concussion. He was ruled out for Week 15 against the Carolina Panthers but started the following week against the Las Vegas Raiders in Week 16. In the game, he threw a game-winning 14-yard touchdown to George Pickens with under a minute left as the Steelers won 13–10. In Week 17 against the Baltimore Ravens, Pickett threw a game-winning touchdown with under a minute left for the second consecutive game; a 10-yard pass to Najee Harris. The Steelers won 16–13, keeping their playoff hopes alive.  Pickett would become the first rookie QB in NFL history to throw a game-winning touchdown in the final minute of the fourth quarter in two straight games.

NFL career statistics

Regular season

References

External links

 
 
 Pittsburgh Steelers bio
 Pittsburgh Panthers bio

1998 births
Living people
All-American college football players
American football quarterbacks
Ocean Township High School alumni
People from Ocean Township, Monmouth County, New Jersey
Pittsburgh Panthers football players
Pittsburgh Steelers players
Players of American football from New Jersey
Sportspeople from Monmouth County, New Jersey